Llap or variation, may refer to:

 Llap (river), a river in Kosovo
 Llap (region), a region of Kosovo
 Live Long and Prosper (LLAP), a greeting originating from 1960s Star Trek and entering popular culture.

See also

 
 Lap (disambiguation)
 Lapp (disambiguation)
 IIAP (disambiguation)
 IAP (disambiguation)
 UAP (disambiguation)